Natalya Igorevna Seleznyova (born 19 June 1945) is a Soviet and Russian theater and film actress.

Biography
She first took the stage at the age of six, participating in the Red Army Theatre plays. Her notable cinema work includes roles in films directed by Leonid Gaidai, like Operation Y and Shurik's Other Adventures and Ivan Vasilievich: Back to the Future.

In 1966 she graduated from the Boris Shchukin Theatre Institute (course of Boris Zakhava) and became an actress of Moscow Academic Theatre of Satire. In 1968, on the set of film "Caliph-Stork" met the actor Vladimir Andreyev, whom she married.

In the 1970s she became famous in the USSR as Mrs. Katarina, one of the main characters in "The 13 Chairs Pub" TV series. 

In 2014, Seleznyova became an assistant to the Children's Rights Commissioner for the President of the Russian Federation (children's ombudsman).

Awards
Honored Artist of the RSFSR (30 September 1981)
People's Artist of Russia (2 May 1996)
Order of Friendship (1 December 2006)
Order of Honour (Russia) (16 July 2015)

Filmography

References

External links 
 
  Наталья Селезнёва at the KinoExpert.ru

1945 births
Living people
Actresses from Moscow
Soviet film actresses
Soviet stage actresses
Soviet television actresses
Russian film actresses
Russian stage actresses
Russian television actresses
20th-century Russian actresses
21st-century Russian actresses
Recipients of the Order of Honour (Russia)
People's Artists of Russia
Russian child actresses